Attorney General Bowen may refer to:

Edward Bowen (politician) (1780–1866), Attorney-General for Lower Canada
Lionel Bowen (1922–2012), Attorney General of Australia

See also
General Bowen (disambiguation)